The Apple IIe Card is a hardware emulation board, also referred to as compatibility card, which allows compatible Macintosh computers to run software designed for the Apple II series of computers (with the exception of the IIGS). Released in March 1991 for use with the LC family, Apple targeted the card at its widely dominated educational market to ease the transition from Apple II-based classrooms, with thousands of entrenched educational software titles, to Macintosh-based classrooms.

Overview  
Well into the 1990s, most schools still had a substantial investment in Apple II computers and software in their classrooms and labs. However, by that period Apple was looking to phase out the Apple II line, and so introduced the Apple IIe Card as a means to transition Apple II educators (and to a smaller degree, home and small business users) by migrating them over to the Macintosh. By adding the optional PDS card to low cost Macintosh computers, it provided backwards compatibility with the vast Apple II software library of over 10,000 titles. Software could even be run directly from an Apple II floppy diskette, the same way as with an Apple IIe (made possible via the card's cable-adapter that connected a standard Apple 5.25 drive). A similar "Apple IIGS Card" was planned for running 16-bit Apple IIGS software, but was canceled after being deemed too costly, therefore leaving no migration path for that segment of the Apple II line.

Apple asked the media to call the peripheral the "Apple IIe option board", as earlier "emulator" cards were not successful. The Apple IIe Card worked in the Macintosh LC series (I, II, III, III+, 475, 520, 550, 575), as well as the LC-slot compatible Color Classic. When running in Apple II emulation mode, certain Macintosh peripherals and hardware could be "borrowed" and used as Apple II devices. For example, the mouse, keyboard, internal speaker, clock, serial ports (printer, modem, networking), extra RAM (up to 1024 KB), internal 3.5 floppy drive and hard disk all functioned as Apple II devices. Furthermore, with the included Y-cable, Apple II specific peripherals could be used as well: The Apple 5.25, Apple UniDisk 3.5, and an Apple II joystick or paddles. The host Macintosh required special emulation software (a boot disk) launched from System 6.0.8 to 7.5.5 in order to activate the IIe Card.

Technical aspects 
Like the Apple IIe itself, the Apple IIe Card uses an onboard 65C02 CPU. The CPU is software-configurable to run at the Apple IIe's native 1.0 MHz speed or at an accelerated 1.9 MHz. Video emulation (text and graphics) is handled through software using native Macintosh QuickDraw routines, which often results in operations being slower than a real Apple IIe except on higher-end machines. Any Macintosh that supports the card can be switched into 560×384 resolution for better compatibility with the IIe's 280×192 color High-Resolution graphics (essentially doubled in both directions on the Macintosh) and 560x192 monochrome double-high-rez/80 column text mode (doubled vertically), using the card's onboard 17.234mhz oscillator in place of the usual video clock thanks to the local bus nature of the PDS slot. This was particularly applicable to the Color Classic which is otherwise fixed at 512×384 resolution; the monitor scan rate remains the same, but horizontal pixel density (and total pixel clocks per scanline) is increased by 10% to fit the greater resolution in the same width.

The IIe card has 256K RAM; half is used to emulate the Apple IIe's standard 128K memory (reproducing its 64K main RAM plus the 64K bank-switched Extended 80-Column Text Card), and half stores the IIe's ROM. Macworld reported that because Apple IIGS engineers helped design the IIe Card, all copy-protected and other software except for "a few very esoteric games" are compatible. The host Macintosh emulates or provides native access to many of the expansion cards and peripherals one might install in a bare Apple IIe. These services provided to the IIe card makes the simultaneous running of the host's System 7 impossible. Hardware services include a 1.44 MB 3.5" SuperDrive, mouse, 1 MB RAM, 80-column text and graphical monochrome or color display, clock, numeric keypad, two hardware serial ports (in addition to the emulated serial necessary for the IIe mouse), SCSI hard drive, and AppleShare file server. An included "Y-cable" enables the attachment of up to two external 140 KB floppy disk 5.25" Drives, an 800 KB "intelligent" 3.5" UniDisk drive, and a joystick or paddle control for use with the Apple IIe emulator. 800 KB 3.5" Drive and 1.44 MB SuperDrives are not recognized when attached via the Y-cable due to the Disk Controller on the IIe card lacking support. (chip labeled U1A located in zone A1 of card – lower left as pictured above)

The product included the PDS card, Y-cable, owner's manual and two 3.5" floppy disks: the 'Apple IIe installer disk' and the 'Apple IIe card startup disk'. Version 2.2.2d1 is the final revision of the startup disk. Version 2.2.1 and a patch to reach 2.2.2d1 was originally available at Apple Support Area (this software now archived and moved off site, as is the case with the  original manual).

Reception
Apple claimed that the LC helped the company regain educational market share lost to inexpensive PC clones. , about half of the LCs sold to schools used the IIe Card.

Technical specifications 
 LSI Logic Gemini chip (similar to Mega II); a nearly complete Apple IIe on a single microcircuit – minus RAM, firmware, CPU and video generation
 IWM (Integrated Woz Machine) for floppy control functions
 256 KB RAM built-in (128 KB for Apple II memory, 128 KB reserved for Macintosh)
 65C02 processor running at either 1.023 MHz or 1.9 MHz
 High-density 26-pin connector with "Y-cable" supports joystick/paddles and two Apple 5.25" or UniDisk 3.5" floppy disk drives
 Ability to access up to 1 MB of native Macintosh RAM
 All Apple IIe text and video modes supported, via QuickDraw software emulation

Notes: When emulating the Apple IIe, only a full-screen mode is available and all native Macintosh functions are suspended while running (a proprietary graphical control panel, running outside MacOS, is available for configuring the virtual Apple II slots and peripherals; however, both native and emulated computer function are suspended during this activity). Macintosh functions and control resume only once emulation is completely shut down and exited.

Host system compatibility 
The card plugs into the PDS slot in many of the LC-series Macintoshes, but not all models and system software combinations are supported. Apple's Tech Info Library article #8458 lists the following models as Apple IIe Card-compatible: Color Classic, Colour Classic II, LC, LC II, III & III+; LC 475, 520, 550, 575; Quadra 605 and Performa 4XX, 52X, 55X, 56X, and 57X. However, other 68K models that have an LC-compatible PDS slot and support 24-bit memory addressing are generally compatible with the Apple IIe Card but are not officially supported. The host Macintosh requires Apple's emulation software (a boot disk) launched from System 6.0.8 to 7.5.5 in order to activate the IIe Card. Systems 7.0 through 7.5.5 support both 24- and 32-bit addressing on suitable Macintosh models (from System 7.6 onwards, Macintosh system software does not support the required 24-bit addressing). 24-bit addressing can be enabled on supported systems with the Macintosh Memory control panel. The Apple IIe Card will not work with 32-bit addressing enabled or Macintosh System Software or machines locked to this mode.

Contrary to some sources, the LC 630 and Quadra 630 are not compatible with the Apple IIe card because those computers do not support 24-bit mode.

Timelines

See also
Apple II peripheral cards

References

External links 
 Apple IIe Card FAQ
 Using an Apple IIe Card in Your Macintosh
 Macintosh Compatibility Table
 Comm Slot Compatibility
 Apple IIe Card software

IIe card
Compatibility cards
IIe card
Macintosh internals
Products introduced in 1991